Christopher Paul McPherson (born 19 June 1984) is a Brazilian field hockey player. He competed in the men's field hockey tournament at the 2016 Summer Olympics.

References

External links
 

1984 births
Living people
Brazilian male field hockey players
Olympic field hockey players of Brazil
Field hockey players at the 2016 Summer Olympics
Sportspeople from Derby
Field hockey players at the 2015 Pan American Games
Pan American Games competitors for Brazil
Brazilian people of English descent
Brazilian people of Scottish descent
21st-century Brazilian people